Coquí for several species of small frogs in the genus Eleutherodactylus native to Puerto Rico. They are onomatopoeically named for the very loud mating call which the males of two species, the common coqui and the upland coqui, make at night. The coquí is one of the most common frogs in Puerto Rico, with more than 16 different species found within its territory, including 13 in El Yunque National Forest. Other species of this genus can be found in the rest of the Caribbean and elsewhere in the Neotropics, in Central and South America. The coquí is an unofficial national symbol of Puerto Rico; there is a Puerto Rican expression that goes, “Soy de aquí, como el coquí”, which translates to “I’m from here, like the coquí."

Characteristics 

Eleutherodactylus is a small tree frog that can vary in color. These frogs can be a mixture of brown, yellow, green, and gray on the top and the bottom side of their body is either white or yellow. The eye color is a variation of brown and gold.  They can range in size from 15mm-80mm. The first word of the species' scientific classification is the genus name Eleutherodactylus which is Ancient Greek and Modern Greek for "free toes", referring to the fact that this species has no webbing in between its toes. The coquí have special disks instead of webbing on their feet, differentiating them from many other types of frogs. The special disks on their feet help the coquí climb and stick to trees and leaves.

Habitat 
Coquís live in tropical areas and have recently been discovered in different levels of elevation. This species tends to stay low to the ground and are generally found at sea level, although the coquí population is growing and they are, in turn, migrating to less populous areas; it is not uncommon to find them in higher levels of elevation. Coquís can be found at up to 1200m in elevation, usually in humid mountain forests or in dry forests. According to the Invasive Species Compendium, the Eleutherodactylus coquí shares the nests of common native species of birds like the “bananaquit (Coereba flaveola portoricensis), the Puerto Rican bullfinch (Loxigilla portoricensis), and the Puerto Rican tody (Todus mexicanus)”. Coquís tend to be in their natural habitats in the forests but it is also common for the species to appear in human territories such as houses, parks, and near bodies of water.

Taxonomy 
Coquíes belong to the Eleutherodactylus genus which in Greek means free toes. Eleutherodactylus contains over 200 species that naturally occur in the southern United States, Central America, South America, and the Caribbean.

Seventeen described species of coquí inhabit Puerto Rico. In 2007, a new species, the coqui llanero, was officially named Eleutherodactylus juanariveroi.

Kingdom: Animalia

Phylum: Chordata

Class: Amphibia

Order: Anura

Family: Leptodactylidae

Genus: Eleutherodactylus

Eleutherodactylus coqui Thomas 1966

Role in the ecosystem 
The various species of coquí control the populations of herbivorous insect species in their local environments. Their voracious appetites focus on arthropods like cockroaches, spiders, crickets, and beetles. Larger coquí species may feast on lizards and fellow frogs.

A study on mass balance and ecosystem processes discussed how animals affect plant and soil pools through excretion. One of the roles coqui frogs play is by greatly increasing nutrient pools in plant biomass and in litter.

The coquís' call 
The coquí frog gets its name from the mating call of the male, which sounds like coquí, or “co-kee.” Male coquí frogs use their call to attract female frogs and establish their territory. When multiple male coquíes are found in the same area, they challenge each other's domain by song. The coquí frog that loses usually flees and tends to relocate to another area or compete for territory elsewhere. Male coquís start singing around the time the sun sets and continue throughout the night, until dawn.

Reproduction 
Although coquíes can reproduce all year long, their breeding is at its peak during the wet season, which is around April to October. Female frogs tend to lay about 15 to 40 eggs roughly five times a year. Coquís differ from most other frog species because coquís lay their eggs in terrestrial plants, whereas other frog species usually lay their eggs in water. The males gather up the eggs and provide protection in a nest, guarding them. Because the eggs must remain moist, male coquíes will periodically leave the nest to collect moisture in order to keep the eggs hydrated when it appears they are beginning to dry out. The male coquí frog keeps the eggs moist by touching them with his moist skin.

Life cycle stages 
When it comes to the stages of a frog's life, the Eleutherodactylus coquí has a unique life cycle. While most frogs begin their lives as tadpole or larval stages (complete with a small tail that aids the juvenile frog in swimming before they develop legs), the coquíes are hatched as tiny frogs with short tails, thereby entirely skipping the tadpole stage. All species of Eleutherodactylus are characterized by direct development in which eggs hatch into small frogs, with the tadpole stage completed within the egg itself. Because coquís do not have a tadpole stage, bodies of water are not necessary for female frogs to lay their eggs.

Once the species reaches their adult stage, most coquí do not live longer than a year, although the National Wildlife Federation claims some coquíes have been found to be as old as six years.

Population decline 
The decline of coquí populations has accelerated since the introduction of the Batrachochytrium dendrobatidis fungus. This pathogenic fungus has been extremely devastating towards amphibian populations as the pathogen impairs the permeability of the skin. The coquís found in El Yunque are resistant to the B. dendrobatidis fungus at the expense of their size, which reduces the aptitude to survive in the wilderness (Burrowes, Longo and Rodríguez 2007). Individual coquí species that carry this fungal resistance are most often found in regions where the B. dendrobatidis fungus is concentrated and the coquí diet is thus more abundant. Although the fungus prefers humid environments, infection is more frequent in drier climates because coquíes tend to cluster in humid sub-areas within this drier climate, thereby increasing the chance of spreading of the pathogen.

Hurricane

The environmental degradation caused by Hurricane Hugo in 1989, the hurricane in 1998, and the two-year drought from 2015 to 2017 have all had a massive impact on the 28,000 acre El Yunque rain forest in Puerto Rico including the resident coqui frogs. Increase in average temperature has already increased the incidence in coqui frogs of Batrachochytrium dendrobatidis, a chytrid fungus that reduces the reproductive capability and increases mortality of the Coqui frogs. The more recent hurricanes Irma and Maria in 2017 hit Puerto Rico. Irma did not directly strike Puerto Rico, but Maria with wind speeds only two miles per hour shy of a category five impacted Puerto Rico directly two weeks later and devastated the forest on a massive level. Specific conditions prevented some sites from massive destruction, but 53% of the Puerto Rican El Yunque rainforest was devastated the forest canopy that had shielded the ground from the sun  and left the ground shaded and cool, was destroyed by Hurricane Maria, and the ground temperature has thus increased by 4 °C. Small changes in release and uptake of carbon dioxide create much larger changes in its atmospheric concentration. The warmed ground areas have shown less root recovery from hurricane damage. Several of the more vulnerable Coqui frogs (E.eneidae and E.karlschmidti), whose ranges are contained within the lower altitudes of the El Yunque National Forest are in imminent danger of extinction.  This has increased the range and success of more resilient species of Coqui frog, especially the Red Eyed Coqui, which can withstand drier periods, fluctuations in temperature and other conditions, as many of the 25 species of Coqui frogs can. In the Luquillo Mountain range, the Mountain Coqui was not endangered, but a result of Hurricane Maria it might have become so.

Geographic distribution/invasive species 
By 2009, the USGS established that it has been identified in Puerto Rico, Hawaii, St. Croix, St. John, St. Thomas, Florida, and the Dominican Republic.

Coquís have become established on the Big Island of Hawai'i, where they are considered an invasive species. Coquí population density in Hawaii can reach 20,000 animals per acre, affecting . Eradication campaigns are underway on Hawaii and Maui.

The Eleutherodactylus coqui was introduced to Hawaii around the late 1980s. This species found its way to the Hawaiian Islands by hiding in plants that were being transported to the islands. Studies have shown that the species has increased the nutrient cycling rates and helped those native species with the lack of nutrients to adapt in better conditions. The coquí have a very small number of predators (rats and some lizards); as a result, the coquí population has increased over time. Another factor in the population increase is that they can breed continuously throughout the year. However, the Eleutherodactylus coquí has also had a negative impact on native species by increasing competition with native birds and other frogs. The expansion of the Eleutherodactylus coquí has forced other creatures such as bats to seek alternatives as they compete for food at higher elevations. Birds and bats were not greatly affected by the introduction of coquís to the island until the frogs started appearing on higher ground. This species is even feeding on native spiders and insects that are close to extinction.

Population Control 
Overall, attempts to limit or control the coquí population where they are invasive have been unsuccessful. In Hawaii, the intentional transportation of frogs is a class C felony, and coquís are labeled as pests.

Another action that appears to be effective in decreasing the coquí population in commercial areas is a hot shower treatment on nursery plants. The hot shower works as a disinfestation treatment for not only the Eleutherodactylus coquí eggs but it is also effective for the adult coquís.

Only a few chemical treatments are legal. Citric acid can be legally used in Hawaii, but the chemical must directly contact coquíes, perhaps even multiple times. However, the citric acid may adversely impact plants and cause unseemly spots. Other substances that are used to control the species are hydrated lime and caffeine. Eradication techniques include hand capture and spraying with a 12% solution of citric acid along with a certification program for nurseries to prevent them from acting as centers of contagion.

The coquí in Puerto Rico

The coquí and the Taino people

The coquí symbol 

Researchers have found petroglyphic images of coquí, including in a cave on Puerto Rico's Mona Island filled with 13th-century petroglyphs depicting Taino culture. With these images, archaeologists were able to understand certain aspects of their way of life, including customs, art, and beliefs. The repeated coquí symbol suggests the influence of the coquí on  art, poetry, and decorative works such as pottery in  Taino society.

In these carvings, the positioning of frog-like hands represented “femaleness.” In addition, coquí frogs with their rich vocals before a rain were said to be associated with women's fertility and children.

The Taino frog legend 
In one legend that explains the birth of the coqui, a goddess fell in love with Coquí, the chief's son. She told him that she would come one evening, but she never came. What did come was the evil Juracán, the deity of chaos and disorder. The sky blackened as the winds quickened. The goddess tried to protect her lover, but Juracán grabbed him away and they never saw each other again. In order to cope with the loss of her Coquí, she created a frog that will forever call out his name: “Co-kee! Co-kee!,” Hence, the birth of the coquí.

Another Legend states that a god named Guahoyona abducted all women from the island, leaving the men to take care of the children, who out of hunger began to cry 'toa toa' or mother-mother. When the children could not be consoled by the men, they turned into frogs.

In popular culture

Puerto Rican boy band Menudo had a song named "Coqui", which they sang on their movie Una Aventura Llamada Menudo, on a scene where coquis can be heard. Also, one can hear the sound of a coqui in the song "Todo me recuerda a ti" by Pedro Capó.

The sound of a coqui can be heard distinctly at the beginning and end of the songs "Acércate" and "Ángel Caído", by singer Ivy Queen.

In the first movement of The Mars Volta's song "Miranda That Ghost Just Isn't Holy Anymore", 4 minutes of coqui frogs can be heard singing (credited as "The Coqui of Puerto Rico" on the album sleeve).

The coquí in literature
Aside from music, the coquí has also made it in the genre of children's literature. Most notably, Callaloo, a well known children's media brand that makes educational and entertaining stories relating to diversity and different cultures, includes a story titled Callaloo: The Legend of the Golden Coquí. It is the second installment in the series, about two kids from New York who travel to Puerto Rico trying to free the golden coquí frog trapped in El Yunque forest using clues left by the Tainos as well as getting help from other coquí frogs.

The coquí and climate change
A study published by the Proceedings of the Royal Society B states that long term temperature rises from climate change has caused significant increases in pitch and shortening of their duration. The increasing temperatures impact on a coquí's call is shown to reduce their body size as well reduce biomass population. This can lead to dire consequences because coquí frogs play an important role in the Puerto Rican rainforest.

If temperature continues to increase, coquís as a whole are predicted to sound and look different in the next century. The survival of the coquís depend on the female coquí's ability to adapt to these changes. If their inner ear are not able to adapt then they won't be able to pick up higher pitched calls leading to mating issues. In addition to coquí population decreasing, having smaller coquís to eat or be eaten by other organisms can destabilize the whole food web of Puerto Rico's rainforest.

See also 

 Common coqui
 Fauna of Puerto Rico
 List of amphibians and reptiles of Puerto Rico

References

External links 
 Hawaiian Ecosystems at Risk project (HEAR), Eleutherodactylus coqui
 University of Hawaii, Control of Coqui Frog in Hawaii
 State of Hawaii, Department of Agriculture, Coqui Frog Information
 ITIS

Eleutherodactylus
Amphibians of Puerto Rico
Amphibian common names
National symbols of Puerto Rico

fr:Coquí